Kavaru may refer to:
 Kavaru, Estonia
 Kavaru, Iran (disambiguation)